Abu Ghraib prison (Sijn Abū Ghurayb) was a prison complex in Abu Ghraib, Iraq, located  west of Baghdad. Abu Ghraib prison was opened in the 1950s and served as a maximum-security prison with torture, weekly executions, and poor living conditions. From the 1970s, the prison was used by Saddam Hussein and later the United States to hold political prisoners. It developed a reputation for torture and extrajudicial killing, and was closed in 2014.

Abu Ghraib gained international attention in 2003 following U.S. invasion of Iraq, when the torture and abuse of detainees committed by guards in part of the complex operated by Coalition forces was exposed. Israeli interrogators were in Iraq, alongside the Coalition, because they spoke Arabic.

In 2006, the United States transferred complete control of Abu Ghraib to the federal government of Iraq, and was reopened in 2009 as Baghdad Central Prison (Arabic: سجن بغداد المركزي Sijn Baġdād al-Markizī). However, due to security concerns during the War in Iraq, it closed in 2014. Since all of the 2,400 inmates were transferred to other high-security prisons, the prison complex is currently vacant, and Saddam-era mass graves have been uncovered at the site.

History 
The prison was built by Western contractors in the 1950s. The prison held as many as 15,000 inmates in 2001. In 2002, Saddam Hussein's government began an expansion project to add six new cellblocks to the prison. In October 2002, he gave amnesty to most prisoners in Iraq. After the prisoners were released and the prison was left empty, it was vandalized and looted. Almost all of the documents relating to prisoners were piled and burnt inside of prison offices and cells, leading to extensive structural damage.

Known mass-graves related to Abu Ghraib include:
 Khan Dhari, west of Baghdad - mass grave with the bodies of political prisoners from Abu Ghraib prison in Baghdad. Fifteen victims were executed on 26 December 1998 and buried by prison authorities under the cover of darkness.
 Al-Zahedi, on the western outskirts of Baghdad - secret graves near a civilian cemetery contain the remains of nearly 1,000 political prisoners. According to an eyewitness, 10 to 15 bodies arrived at a time from the Abu Ghraib prison and were buried by local civilians. An execution on 10 December 1999 in Abu Ghraib claimed the lives of 101 people in one day. On 9 March 2000, 58 prisoners were killed at a time. The last corpse interred was number 993.

2003–2006 

From 2003 until August 2006, Abu Ghraib prison was used for detention purposes by both the U.S.-led coalition forces and the Iraqi government. The Iraqi government has controlled the area of the facility known as "The Hard Site". The prison was used to house only convicted criminals. Suspected criminals, insurgents or those arrested and awaiting trial were held at other facilities, commonly known as "camps" in U.S. military parlance. The U.S. housed all its detainees at "Camp Redemption", which is divided into five security levels. This camp built in the summer of 2004 replaced the three-level setup of Camp Ganci, Camp Vigilant and Abu Ghraib's Tier 1. The remainder of the facility was occupied by the U.S. military.

Abu Ghraib served as both a FOB (Forward Operating Base) and a detention facility. When the U.S. military was using the Abu Ghraib prison as a detention facility, it housed approximately 7,490 prisoners there in March 2004. Later population of detainees was much smaller, because Camp Redemption had a much smaller capacity than Camp Ganci had, and many detainees have been sent from Abu Ghraib to Camp Bucca for this reason. The U.S. military initially held all "persons of interest" in Camp Redemption. Some were suspected rebels, and some suspected criminals. Those convicted by trial in Iraqi court are transferred to the Iraqi-run Hard Site.

In the Abu Ghraib torture and prisoner abuse scandal, reserve soldiers from the 327th Military Police battalion were charged under the Uniform Code of Military Justice with prisoner abuse, beginning with an Army Criminal Investigation Division investigation on January 14, 2004. In April 2004, U.S. television news-magazine 60 Minutes reported on a story from the magazine The New Yorker, which recounted torture and humiliation of Iraqi detainees by U.S. soldiers and contracted civilians. The story included photographs depicting the abuse of prisoners. The events created a substantial political scandal within the U.S. and other coalition countries.

On April 20, 2004, insurgents fired 40 mortar rounds into the prison, killing 24 detainees and injuring 92. Commentators thought the attack was either an attempt to incite a riot or retribution for detainees' cooperating with the United States. In May 2004, the U.S.-led coalition embarked on a prisoner-release policy to reduce numbers to fewer than 2,000. The U.S. military released nearly 1,000 detainees at the prison during the week ending August 27, 2005, at the request of the Iraqi government. In a May 24, 2004 address at the U.S. Army War College, President George W. Bush announced that the prison would be demolished. On June 14 Iraqi interim President Ghazi Mashal Ajil al-Yawer said he opposed this decision; on June 21 U.S. military judge Col. James Pohl ruled the prison was a crime scene and could not be demolished until investigations and trials were completed.

On April 2, 2005, the prison was attacked by more than 60 insurgents in the engagement known as the Battle of Abu Ghraib. In the two hours before being forced to retreat, the attackers suffered at least 50 casualties according to the U.S. military. Thirty-six persons at or in the prison, including U.S. military personnel, civilians and detainees, were injured in the attack. The attackers used small arms, rockets, and RPGs as weapons, and threw grenades over the walls. A suicide VBIED detonated just outside the front wall after Marines fired on it. Officials believe that the car bomb was intended to breach the prison wall, enabling an assault and/or mass escape for detainees. Insurgents also attacked military forces nearby on highways en route to the prison for reinforcement and used ambushes along the roads. Al Qaeda in Iraq claimed responsibility.

2006–2014 
In March 2006, the U.S. military decided to transfer the 4,500 inmates to other prisons and transfer control of the Abu Ghraib prison to Iraqi authorities. The prison was reported emptied of prisoners in August 2006. The formal transfer was made on September 2, 2006. The formal transfer was conducted between Major General Jack Gardner, Commander of Task Force 134, and representatives of the Iraqi Ministry of Justice and the Iraqi Army.

In February 2009, Iraq reopened Abu Ghraib under the new name of Baghdad Central Prison. It was designed to house 3,500 inmates. The government said it planned to increase the number up to 15,000 prisoners by the end of the year.

A major prison break occurred on July 21, 2013, and media outlets reported a mass breakout of prisoners at Abu Ghraib. Reportedly, at least 500 prisoners escaped. A senior member of the security and defense committee in parliament described the prisoners as mostly those who were "convicted senior members of al-Qaeda and had received death sentences." A simultaneous attack occurred at another prison, in Taji, around 12 miles north of Baghdad, where 16 members of the Iraqi security forces and six militants were killed. The Islamic State of Iraq and the Levant (ISIL) issued a statement on a jihadist forum claiming that they were responsible for organising and executing the prison break, which had taken months of preparation, and claimed that the attacks involved 12 car bombs, suicide bombers and a barrage of mortars and rockets. They also claimed that they killed more than 120 government troops, though the Iraqi authorities claimed that 25 members of the security forces were killed, along with 21 prisoners and at least 10 militants.

Closure 
On April 15, 2014, the Iraqi Justice Ministry announced that it had closed the prison amid fear that it could be taken over by ISIL, which controlled much of Anbar Province at the time. All 2,400 inmates were moved to other high-security facilities in the country. It was not made clear if the closure is temporary or permanent.

Notable detainees 
 Farzad Bazoft
 Yunis Khatayer Abbas
 Emad al-Janabi
 Manadel al-Jamadi
 Abu Abdulrahman al-Bilawi
 Bill Barloon
 Thahe Mohammed Sabbar
 John Nichol, a Royal Air Force navigator shot down and captured by Iraqi forces during Operation Desert Storm
Abu Bakr al-Baghdadi, born Ibrahim Awad Ibrahim al-Badry, who would later become the leader of the IS from May 2010 until his death on October 26, 2019.
Ali Shallal al-Qaisi

Notable U.S. military guards 
 Lynndie England
 Sabrina Harman
 Charles Graner
 Ivan Frederick
 Jeremy Sivits
 Roman Krol
 Armin Cruz
 Javal Davis

See also 

 Human rights in Saddam Hussein's Iraq
 Human rights in post-Saddam Iraq
Abu Ghraib torture and prisoner abuse
U.S. prison operations in Iraq

References

External links 
 The Prisoner or: How I Planned to Kill Tony Blair, a documentary about the imprisonment and abuse of one Iraqi journalist, Yunis Khatayer Abbas, and his two brothers at Abu Ghraib prison.
 Standard Operating Procedure (film)

1950s establishments in Iraq
Abu Ghraib torture and prisoner abuse
Defunct prisons
George W. Bush administration controversies
Human rights abuses in Iraq
Military prisons
Military installations of Iraq
Military police of the United States
Penal system in Iraq
Prisons in Iraq